Sean Patrick Cannon (born December 31, 1981) is an American Film Director, Producer, Editor, and Screenwriter  based in Sherman Oaks, California,  best known for the film American High School.

Life and career
Cannon was born in New York City and moved to Los Angeles, California when he was 21 years old, to attend the American Film Institute. He also studied at Franklin & Marshall College,  Vassar College,  Rutgers University, Princeton University, and in the UK at the University of East Anglia.

In 2007 came American High School, a feature-comedy he wrote and directed, starring Laguna Beach alum Talan Torriero, with Danity Kane's Aubrey O'Day.  The movie also stars Pirates of the Caribbean's  Martin Klebba and American Pie's Nikki Ziering.  The film was released through Anchor Bay, & acquired by Lionsgate.

From 2012-2013, he edited the online talent competition Internet Icon 
https://en.wikipedia.org/wiki/Internet_Icon

In 2020, after over a decade in reality television production, Cannon wrote, directed, edited, produced, & co-funded the feature film The 3rd Guest.  The film released through Indican Pictures in January of 2023.

Throughout 2021, Cannon was a Post-Production Producer at Riotmaker. 

In 2022, Cannon joined Ignition Creative in a similar role.  

He currently serves a freelance editor role at Lemonlight, & Blast Global Media

References

External links

 https://seanpatrickcannon.myportfolio.com/
 https://www.linkedin.com/in/seanpatrickcannon/

1981 births
Living people
Vassar College alumni
Rutgers University alumni
Princeton University alumni
American film directors
American male writers